Niclas Heimann (born 12 March 1991) is a German professional footballer who plays as a goalkeeper for Regionalliga Südwest club SGV Freiberg.

With Rot-Weiss Essen Heimann won the Lower Rhine Cup in 2015 and 2016.

References

External links
 
 

1991 births
Living people
People from Oberbergischer Kreis
Sportspeople from Cologne (region)
German footballers
Footballers from North Rhine-Westphalia
Association football goalkeepers
Germany youth international footballers
FC Red Bull Salzburg players
Chelsea F.C. players
Eredivisie players
VVV-Venlo players
FC Energie Cottbus players
Rot-Weiss Essen players
SV Rödinghausen players
SSV Ulm 1846 players
SGV Freiberg players
Regionalliga players
German expatriate footballers
German expatriate sportspeople in England
Expatriate footballers in England
German expatriate sportspeople in Austria
Expatriate footballers in Austria
German expatriate sportspeople in the Netherlands
Expatriate footballers in the Netherlands